The Mill Avenue Bridges consist of two bridges that cross the Salt River in Tempe, Arizona, at the north end of the shopping district on Mill Avenue. The first bridge opened in August 1931 and the second bridge opened in 1994.

Original span
The original bridge was built in 1931 but was not dedicated until 1 May 1933. The dedication celebration lasted for two days. Attending the celebration was Benjamin Baker Moeur, a former Tempe doctor and the governor at that time. The creation of this bridge replaced the Ash Avenue Bridge, which was a one-lane highway bridge which was originally completed in 1913. It was demolished in 1991. In the Phoenix area, besides the Center Street Bridge, which opened on Central Avenue in 1911, it was one of two crossings at the Salt River for some time.

Water flowed down the Salt River until the 1940s, when dams were constructed upstream. The water flow almost ceased, creating a dry river bed to support the growing Southwest. For years, southbound traffic used both lanes of the bridge, while northbound traffic utilized an unbridged crossing in the riverbed.

Despite the Salt's being a dry river, water occasionally flowed. When reservoir levels got too high, the dams were required to release water, causing water to flow once more. Due to monsoon storms heavy rains would fall, and washes and street runoff emptied into the river. At such times the unbridged crossing was closed, and the bridge was opened to north- and southbound traffic, one lane in each direction.

The bridge faced many strong floods that raged through the Salt River Valley. In 1980 all but two of the bridged crossings on the Salt River were closed for safety reasons (principally erosion of the approaches) due to severe flooding. The Mill Avenue Bridge and one other bridge, the Central Avenue bridge in Phoenix, were the only bridges that remained open. This was because they were structurally sound to stand up to the raging currents. In one 24-hour period during this flood, 92,000 vehicles crossed the bridge.

The Old Mill Avenue Bridge was listed on the National Register of Historic Places in 1981, celebrating the 50th anniversary of its opening. The Old Mill Avenue Bridge is also listed on the Tempe Historic Property Register. It was the eighth property to be added to that list, receiving designation on November 4, 1999.

New span
As traffic congestion increased, the city began preparations for a new bridge crossing parallel to the existing. In the early 1990s construction began on the new crossing. In the spring of 1993, floods returned to the valley again and hampered construction efforts on the new bridge as flood waters tore down scaffolding and form work on the new bridge project. Opening was delayed but eventually the project was completed.

The New Mill Avenue Bridge (located directly to the east, upstream) opened in 1994 to relieve the original bridge from the increasing traffic. This allowed for two lanes to travel in each direction (north and south), instead of the previous single, two-lane bridge. With the opening of the northbound bridge, the unbridged crossing was permanently closed. With two lanes now running in each direction no matter the weather, monsoon storms and releases from dams no longer lead to traffic obstructions.

Tempe Town Lake era

In 1999 the dry river bed was transformed into a dammed artificial lake. Tempe Town Lake was a key success to the revitalization of downtown Tempe. Formerly just a crossing over the (usually) dry river, these bridges became a centerpiece of the new lake. This prompted a lot of development along the lake. Today, mid-rise offices rise above the southeast portion of the bridges.

Every Fourth of July the CBS 5 July 4 Tempe Town Lake Festival is held at the lake. The fireworks for the celebration are launched from the bridges.

The Mill Avenue Bridges complex also includes two rail bridges slightly downstream from the motor-traffic bridges: a railroad bridge of many decades' standing, and parallel to it a new bridge to accommodate the Phoenix Light Rail system, which opened in late 2008.

On September 21, 2018, the Mill Avenue Bridges were designated as part of Historic U.S. Route 80 by the Arizona Department of Transportation.

On July 29, 2020, the 1915 rail bridge adjacent to the Mill Avenue Bridges partially collapsed due to the derailment of a Union Pacific train and a subsequent fire that spread across the wooden components of the bridge structure, also causing damage in adjacent areas of Tempe Beach Park.

See also
List of bridges documented by the Historic American Engineering Record in Arizona

References

External links

Bridges completed in 1931
Bridges completed in 1994
Buildings and structures in Tempe, Arizona
Historic American Engineering Record in Arizona
Road bridges in Arizona
Transportation in Tempe, Arizona
Transportation in Maricopa County, Arizona
1931 establishments in Arizona
U.S. Route 80